Hide and Seek (released as Amorous in the United States) is a 2014 British-American romantic drama film, directed by Joanna Coates and co-written by Coates and Daniel Metz.

The film won the Michael Powell Award at the Edinburgh International Film Festival.

Plot
In an English cottage, four young people from London move in together, seeking to challenge social conventions and their own tolerances by engaging in scheduled partner-swapping. The durability of their new living arrangements is tested by the arrival of an outsider who fails to get in tune with the foursome's radical spirit.

Cast
 Josh O'Connor as Max
 Hannah Arterton as Charlotte
 Rea Mole as Leah
 Daniel Metz as Jack
 Joe Banks as Simon

References

External links
 
 
 

2014 films
2014 romantic drama films
British romantic drama films
American romantic drama films
2010s English-language films
2010s American films
2010s British films